WXOF (96.7 MHz) is a commercial FM radio station licensed to Yankeetown, Florida.  The station is owned by WGUL-FM, Inc.  It airs a classic rock radio format.  It sometimes describes itself on the air as "classic hits" but it plays popular classic rock tracks from the 1970s and 80s, with no pop or dance songs.  WXOF carries the syndicated Nights with Alice Cooper classic rock radio show on weekday evenings.

History
The station went on the air as WAZN on 1998-04-20.  On 1998-07-10, the station changed its call sign to WBKX, on 1999-01-11 to the current WXOF.  Before switching to classic hits, it was a country music station.

On December 7, 2012 WXOF upgraded its signal by moving from 96.3 FM to 96.7 FM and raising effective radiated power from 3,500 watts to 14,500 watts.

References

External links

XOF
Radio stations established in 1998
1998 establishments in Florida